Giancarlo Badessi (1928 – 2011) was an Italian actor.

Life and career
Born in Lecco, at the age of almost 40 Badessi gave up his daily job as an accountant to embrace the theatre, making his debut in a stage play directed by Giancarlo Cobelli. He was also active in cinema and on television, often playing character roles.

Badessi died in Rome at the age of 83 from a heart attack, on 6 December 2011.

Filmography

References

External links
 

1928 births
People from Lecco
2011 deaths
Italian male film actors